This article is a list of notable people who were born in and/or have lived in Wichita, Kansas.  Alumni of universities within the city, including athletes and coaches, that are not originally from Wichita should not be included in this list, instead, they should be listed in the alumni list article for each university.

Academia

 June Bacon-Bercey (1932–2019), meteorologist
 Robert Ballard (1942–), oceanographer
 Elizabeth Bates (1947–2003), cognitive neuroscientist, developmental psychologist
 James Earl Baumgartner (1943–2011), mathematician
 Robert Beattie, lawyer, non-fiction crime writer, professor
 James F. Crow (1916–2012), geneticist
 Juan R. Cruz (1946–), aerospace engineer
 John W. Dawson, Jr (1944–), mathematician
 Thomas Everhart, president, California Institute of Technology and chancellor, University of Illinois at Urbana-Champaign
 William Fetter (1928–2002), graphic designer, computer graphics pioneer
 Linda Flower (1944–), composition theorist, college professor
 L. Adrien Hannus (1944–), anthropologist
 Leo George Hertlein (1898–1972), paleontologist
 George W. Hoss (1824–1906), educator
 Howard W. Johnston (1913–2005), educator, founder of the Free University of Berlin
 Kenn Kaufman (1954–), author, bird expert, conservationist
 John Gamble Kirkwood (1907–1959), chemist, physicist
 Mirra Komarovsky (1905–1999), sociologist
 Lincoln LaPaz (1897–1985), astronomer
 Judith Ann Mayotte (1937–), ethicist, humanitarian
 M. Lee Pelton (1950–), university administrator
 Vernon L. Smith (1927–), economist
 Robert Whittaker (1920–1980), plant ecologist

Arts, design, and entertainment

Architecture 

 Charles F. McAfee (born 1932), architect, building material manufacturer, and housing activist
 Cheryl L. McAfee (born c. 1958), architect
 W. H. Weeks (1864–1936), architect

Cartoonists and illustrators 

 Jerry Bittle (1949–2003), cartoonist
 Reed Crandall (1917–1982), comic book artist
 Jack Hamm (1916–1996), cartoonist
 Bob Peak (1927–1992), illustrator
 Robert C. Stanley (1918–1996), illustrator
 Tom Tomorrow (1961–), cartoonist

Fashion
 Lindsey Wixson (1994–), model

Film, television, and theatre

 Bill Allen (1962–), actor
 Kirstie Alley (1951–2022), actress
 Nicholas Barton (1983–), screenwriter, director
 Annette Bening (1958–), actress
 John Born, magician
 Louise Brooks (1906–1985), actress
 Chris Buck (1960–), director, animator
 Darren E. Burrows (1966–), actor
 Christopher Connelly (1941–1988), actor
 Bruce Conner (1933–2008), experimental filmmaker, visual artist
 Al Corley (1956–), actor, singer
 Lorianne Crook (1957–), radio and TV host, producer, writer
 Julie Cypher (1964–), film director
 Ruby Dandridge (1900–1987), actress
 John Duncan (1953–), performance artist
 Tamara Feldman (1980–), actress
 Ron Foster (1930–2015), actor
 Rift Fournier (1936–2013), screenwriter, producer
 Alan Fudge (1944–2011), actor
 Jonathan Glickman (1969–), film producer
 Laurel Goodwin (1942–), film & tv actress
 Danford B. Greene (1928–2015), film editor
 Colton Haynes (1988–), actor
 Herb Jeffries (1913–2014), actor, singer-songwriter
 Cal Johnson, stuntman
 Don Johnson (1949–), actor
 Neal Jones (1960–), actor
 Richard Kassebaum (1960–2008), documentary filmmaker
 Robert Kelker-Kelly (1964–), actor
 Jeffrey L. Kimball (1943–), cinematographer
 Etta McDaniel (1890–1946), actress
 Hattie McDaniel (1895–1952), actress
 Sam McDaniel (1886–1962), actor
 Trey McIntyre (1969–), dancer, choreographer
 Vera Miles (1929–), actress
 Jeff Probst (1961–), TV talk and reality show host
 Danny Roew (1980–), film director
 Vivian Schilling (1968–), actress, novelist, screenwriter
 Natasha Rothwell (1980–), actress
 Kendall Schmidt (1990–), actor
 Cynthia Sikes (1954–), actress
 Barbara Sinatra (1927–2017), model, showgirl
 Norma Smallwood (1909–1966), Miss America 1926
 David Rees Snell (1966–), actor
 Taryn Southern (1986–), actress, comedian, singer
 Ruthelma Stevens (1903–1984), actress
 John Cameron Swayze (1906–1995), TV journalist, game show panelist, product spokesperson
 Hannah Wagner (1995–), Miss Kansas 2015
 Jessie E. Woods (1909–2001), stunt pilot

Journalism

 David Bloom (1963–2003), television reporter
 Cheryl Burton (1962–), news anchor
 Steve Doocy (1956–), news anchor
 Dave Evans (1962–), reporter
 Shon Gables, news anchor
 Gregg Jarrett (1955–), news anchor
 Mike Jerrick (1950–), news anchor
 Sheinelle Jones (1978–), journalist, news anchor
 Tony Laubach (1980–), storm chaser and meteorologist, journalist
 Jim Lehrer (1934–2020), journalist, news anchor
 Melissa McDermott, news anchor
 Kevin Merida (1957–), journalist, editor
 Susan Page (1951–), journalist
 Susan Peters, news anchor
 Tracy Rowlett (1942–), news anchor, sports reporter
 W. Eugene Smith (1918–1978), photojournalist

Literature

 Loren Goodman (1968–), poet, professor
 William Inge (1913–1973), novelist, playwright
 Michael McClure (1932–2020), Beat poet, playwright, novelist
 Antonya Nelson (1961–), novelist, short story writer
 Randall Parrish (1858–1923), dime novelist
 Janet Peery (1948–), novelist, short story writer
 Scott Phillips (1961–), novelist
 Rolf Potts (1970–), travel writer, essayist
 Deborah Raney (1955–), novelist
 Lois Ruby, novelist
 Sharon Shinn (1957–), novelist
 Jan Strnad (1950–), novelist, comic book writer
 Earl Thompson (1931–1978), novelist
 Clare Vanderpool (1965–), Newbery Medal-winning children's author
 Stephen Yenser (1941–), poet, literary critic

Music

 Hawley Ades (1908–2008), choral arranger
 Matt Alber (1975–), singer-songwriter
 Terry Allen (1943–), country singer, visual artist
 Chris Arpad (1967–), solo steel pannist
 Jay Bentley (1964–), bass guitarist
 Gage Brewer (1904–1985), guitarist, bandleader
 Freddie Brooks (1962–), blues harmonica player, singer-songwriter
 Karla Burns, opera singer, actress
 Ken Carson (1914–1994), singer
 Gaylord Carter (1905–2000), organist, composer
 Nancy Cartonio (1977–), folk musician, songwriter, producer
 Les C. Copeland (1887–1942), composer, pianist
 Annette Daniels (1961–2004), opera singer
 Martha Davis (1917–1960), singer, pianist
 Ellery Eskelin (1959–), saxophonist
 Gordon Goodwin (1954–), composer, pianist, saxophonist
 Arthur Gunn, (1997–) singer, runner up in the 18th season of American Idol, emigrated from Nepal to Wichita when he was 17.
 Skinny Hightower, (1985–), jazz pianist
 Richard Joiner (1918–1999), clarinetist
 Stan Kenton (1911–1979), composer, jazz pianist
 Kidd Chris (1974–), disc jockey
 Bob Koester (1932–2021), blues and jazz record producer
 Shawn Lee (1963–), multi-instrumentalist, composer, producer
 Slats Long (1906–1964), jazz clarinetist
 Chris Mann (1982–), singer-songwriter
 Marilyn Maye (1928–), cabaret singer
 Kirke Mechem (1925–), composer
 Brian Alexander Morgan, record producer
 Rich Mullins (1955–1997), Christian music singer-songwriter
 Scott Muni (1930–2004), disc jockey
 Vernon Oxford (1941–), country music singer, fiddler, guitarist
 Pink Nasty (1982–), singer-songwriter
 Marvin Rainwater (1925–2013), singer-songwriter
 William M. Runyan (1870–1957), Christian composer who wrote "Great is Thy Faithfulness"
 Mark Shelton, heavy metal musician (Manilla Road)
 Nathaniel Clark Smith (1877–1935), bandleader, composer
 Phil Stacey (1978–), singer, finalist on the 6th season of American Idol
 André J. Thomas (1952–), composer, conductor
 Charlie Tuna (1944–), disc jockey, radio personality
 Joe Walsh (1947–), rock guitarist, singer-songwriter
 Johnny Western (1934–), singer-songwriter, actor, disc jockey
 XV (1985–), rapper

Visual fine arts

 Blackbear Bosin (1921–1980), painter, sculptor
 Bessie Callender (1889–1951), sculptor
 Mary Fuller (1922–2022), sculptor
 Laura Gilpin (1891–1979), photographer
 Edgar Heap of Birds (1954–), painter, sculptor
 Reva Jackman (1892–1966), painter, printmaker
 Frederick R. Koch (1933–2020), arts patron, collector, philanthropist
 John Noble (1874–1934), painter, photographer
 Tom Otterness (1952–), sculptor

Business

 Olive Ann Beech (1903–1993), U.S. aviation pioneer and businesswoman
 Walter Herschel Beech (1891–1950), aviator, industrialist
 Dan (1931–) and Frank Carney (1938–2020), businessmen, founders of Pizza Hut
 Steve Case (1958–), investor, business executive
 Clyde Cessna (1879–1954), aviation industrialist
 Jesse Chisholm (1805–1868), trader
 William Coffin Coleman (1870–1957), inventor, founder of the Coleman Company
 Bill Cooper (1921–2008), business executive, Dallas civic leader
 Bill Koch (1940–), businessman, sailor
 Charles G. Koch (1935–), business magnate, political lobbyist
 David H. Koch (1940–2019), business magnate, political lobbyist
 Fred C. Koch (1900–1967), chemical engineer, oil refining entrepreneur
 Clay Lacy (1932–), aviation entrepreneur, pilot, aerial cinematographer
 Bill Lear (1902–1978), aviation industrialist, inventor
 Roy LoPresti (1929–2002), aerospace engineer, aviation executive
 James R. Mead (1836–1910), trader, city co-founder
 Albert Mooney (1904–1986), aircraft designer, aviation entrepreneur
 Herbert Rawdon (1904–1975), aircraft engineer
 Phil Ruffin (1936–), business magnate
 Lloyd Stearman (1898–1975), engineer, aviation industrialist
 Michael S. Thompson (1948–), beekeeper, landscaper
 Dwane L. Wallace, aircraft designer, former CEO and chairman of Cessna Aircraft
 C. Howard Wilkins, Jr. (1938–2016), Pizza Hut executive and franchisee, Republican fundraiser, and U.S. Ambassador to the Netherlands

Crime
 John Callahan (1866–1936), bank robber, money launderer
 Gary Lee Davis (1944–1997), murderer, rapist
 Rose Dunn (1878–1955), outlaw
 Eric Harris (1981–1999), one of two perpetrators of the Columbine High School massacre
 Adrian Lamo (1981–2018), computer hacker, lived in Wichita for an unknown amount of time before he died
 Dennis Rader (1945–), serial killer known as "BTK"

Law enforcement
 James Earp (1841–1926), lawman, saloon keeper
 Wyatt Earp (1848–1929), lawman
 Cassius M. Hollister (1845–1884), lawman
 Bat Masterson (1853–1921), lawman, buffalo hunter, journalist
 Ed Masterson (1852–1878), lawman, buffalo hunter
 James Masterson (1855–1895), lawman, buffalo hunter
 Robert McKay (1919–1990), lawyer, investigator
 O.W. Wilson (1900–1972), police chief

Medicine
 Thomas Stoltz Harvey (1912–2007), pathologist
 Hugh D. Riordan (1932–2005), psychiatrist, researcher
 George Tiller (1941–2009), physician, abortion provider

Military
 Micky Axton (1919–2010), Women Airforce Service Pilots test pilot
 Erwin R. Bleckley (1894–1918), U.S. Army Air Services aviator, Medal of Honor recipient
 Tod Bunting (1958–), U.S. Air Force Major General, Adjutant General of Kansas
 Laura M. Cobb (1892–1981), World War II naval nurse
 Richard Cowan (1922–1944), soldier, Medal of Honor recipient
 Paul Frederick Foster (1889–1972), U.S. Navy Vice Admiral
 James Jabara (1923–1966), military aviator
 William McGonagle (1925–1999), U.S. Navy Captain
 Bryce Poe II (1924–2000), U.S. Air Force General
 Edwin Ramsey (1917–2013), U.S. Army Lt. Colonel
 Jesse J. Taylor (1925–1965), U.S. Navy Lt. Commander

Politics

National

 Henry Justin Allen (1868–1950), U.S. Senator from Kansas, 21st Governor of Kansas
 William Augustus Ayres (1867–1952), U.S. Representative from Kansas
 Sheila Bair (1954–), Chairperson of the Federal Deposit Insurance Corporation
 James F. Battin (1925–1996), U.S. Representative from Montana
 Richard Ely Bird (1878–1955), U.S. Representative from Kansas
 Robert C. Bonner (1942–), U.S. federal judge
 Earl Browder (1891–1973), Chairman of the Communist Party USA
 Dwight Chapin (1940–), Deputy Assistant to President Richard Nixon
 Betty Dodson (1929–2020), sexologist, political activist
 Ann Dunham (1942–1995), mother of President Barack Obama
 Stanley Armour Dunham (1918–1992), maternal grandfather of President Barack Obama
 David M. Ebel (1940–), U.S. federal judge
 Ron Estes (1956–), U.S. Representative from Kansas
 Gregory Kent Frizzell (1956–), U.S. federal judge
 Robert Gates (1943–), U.S. Secretary of Defense
 L. M. Gensman (1878–1954), U.S. Representative from Oklahoma
 Dan Glickman (1944–), U.S. Representative from Kansas, U.S. Secretary of Agriculture
 John Mills Houston (1890–1975), U.S. Representative from Kansas
 William Marion Jardine (1879–1955), U.S. Secretary of Agriculture
 Hugh S. Johnson (1881–1942), National Recovery Administration chief
 Karen R. Keesling (1946–2012), Assistant Secretary of the Air Force
 Patrick F. Kelly (1929–2007), U.S. federal judge
 Mary Elizabeth Lease (1850–1933), political activist, lecturer
 Chester I. Long (1860–1934), U.S. Senator from Kansas
 Edmond H. Madison (1865–1911), U.S. Representative from Kansas
 George McGill (1879–1963), U.S. Senator from Kansas
 Eric F. Melgren (1956–), U.S. federal judge
 Troy Newman (1966–), anti-abortion activist
 Roger Noriega (1959–), U.S. Ambassador to the OAS
 Gale Norton (1954–), U.S. Secretary of the Interior
 Mike Pompeo (1963–), U.S. Representative (2011–2017), CIA director (2017–2018) and United States Secretary of State (2018–2021) under Donald Trump
 Darrel Ray (1950–), psychologist, atheist activist
 James Reeb (1927–1965), civil rights activist, Unitarian Universalist minister
 Dale E. Saffels (1921–2002), U.S. federal judge
 Matt Schlapp (1967–), conservative political activist
 Garner E. Shriver (1912–1998), U.S. Representative from Kansas
 Horace G. Snover (1847–1924), U.S. Representative from Michigan
 Arlen Specter (1930–2012), U.S. Senator from Pennsylvania
 William Stearman (1922–2021), senior U.S. Foreign Service Officer, policy adviser
 Cheryl Sullenger (1955–), anti-abortion activist
 W. Paul Thayer (1919–2010), U.S. Deputy Secretary of Defense
 Ron Walters (1938–2010), civil rights activist, author, professor
 Jack B. Weinstein (1921–2021), U.S. federal judge
 Roy Lee Williams (1915–1989), labor union leader
 Gerald Burton Winrod (1900–1957), Nazi sympathizer, anti-Semitic political activist
 Ron Wyden (1949–), U.S. Senator from Oregon

State

 Edward F. Arn (1906–1998), 32nd Governor of Kansas
 Carol A. Beier (1958–), Kansas Supreme Court justice
 Donald Betts (1978–), Kansas state legislator
 Sydney Carlin (1944–), Kansas state legislator
 Leo Delperdang, (1962–), Kansas state legislator
 Leslie Donovan (1936–), Kansas state legislator
 Paul Dugan (1939–), 40th Lieutenant Governor of Kansas
 Jerry Elliott (1936–2010), Kansas Court of Appeals judge
 Oletha Faust-Goudeau, Kansas state legislator
 Gail Finney (1959–2022), Kansas state legislator
 Kent Frizzell (1929–2016), Kansas Attorney General
 U. L. Gooch (1923–2021), Kansas state legislator
 Harry L. Gordon (1860–1921), Lieutenant Governor of Ohio
 Raj Goyle (1975–), Kansas politician
 Phil Hermanson (1965–), Kansas state legislator
 Donald Hollowell (1917–2004), Georgia civil rights lawyer
 Bonnie Huy (1935–2013), Kansas state legislator
 Dan Kerschen (1952–), Kansas state legislator
 Lorenzo D. Lewelling (1846–1900), 12th Governor of Kansas
 Tom Malone (1953–), Kansas Court of Appeals judge
 Vern Miller (1928–2021), Kansas Attorney General
 John E. Moore (1943–), 65th Lieutenant Governor of Kansas
 Elaine Nekritz (1957–), Illinois state legislator
 Leslie Osterman (1947–), State Representative from Wichita since 2011
 Mark Parkinson (1957–), 45th Governor of Kansas
 Loren Parks (1926–), Oregon political activist
 David L. Payne (1836–1884), leader of the "Boomer Army" to settle Oklahoma
 Mike Petersen (1960–), Kansas state legislator
 Jo Ann Pottorff, Kansas state legislator
 John Rankin Rogers (1838–1901), 3rd Governor of Washington
 Tom Sawyer (1958–), Kansas state legislator
 Jean Schodorf (1950–), Kansas state legislator
 William E. Stanley (1844–1910), 15th Governor of Kansas
 Sara Steelman (1946–), Pennsylvania state legislator
 David Stras (1974–), Minnesota Supreme Court Justice
 Gene Suellentrop (1952–), Kansas state legislator
 Dale Swenson (1957–), State Representative from Wichita, 2001 to 2011
 Ponka-We Victors (1981–), Kansas state legislator
 Susan Wagle (1953–), Kansas state legislator
 Jim Ward (1957–), Kansas state legislator
 Vincent Wetta (1945–), Kansas state legislator

Local

Religion
 Bruce P. Blake, United Methodist Church bishop
 Leo Christopher Byrne (1908–1974), Roman Catholic Church archbishop
 Carl A. Kemme (1960–), Roman Catholic Church bishop
 Thomas Olmsted (1947–), Roman Catholic Church bishop
 Michael Sheehan (1939–), Roman Catholic Church archbishop
 Richard B. Wilke, United Methodist Church bishop
 Mrinalini Mata (1931–2017), President of Self-Realization Fellowship/ Yogoda Satsanga Society of India

Sports

American football

 David Arkin (1987–), Dallas Cowboys offensive tackle
 Tony Barker (1968–), NFL linebacker
 Blake Bell (1991–), tight end
 Mark Bell (1957–), NFL defensive end
 Mike Bell (1957–), Kansas City Chiefs defensive end
 Russ Bolinger (1954–), NFL offensive lineman
 Arthur Brown (1990–), NFL linebacker
 Bryce Brown (1991–), NFL running back
 Don Calhoun (1952–), NFL running back
 Russ Campbell (1969–), tight end
 Wendell Davis (1973–), cornerback, coach
 Mark Duckens (1965–), NFL defensive end, tackle
 Ron Faurot (1962–), New York Jets defensive end
 B. J. Finney (1991–), guard
 Ted Gilmore (1967–), wide receivers coach
 Kelly Gregg (1976–), NFL nose tackle
 Bill Hachten (1924–), guard
 Breece Hall (2001–), running back
 Chris Harper (1989–), wide receiver
 Davontae Harris (1995–), cornerback
 Joe Hastings (1987–), wide receiver
 Doug Hoppock (1960–), offensive lineman
 Randy Jackson (1948–2010), running back
 Allen Lyday (1960–), NFL defensive back
 Elbert Mack (1986–), cornerback
 Bruce McCray (1963–), Chicago Bears defensive back
 Brian Moorman (1976–), punter
 Richard Osborne (1953–), tight end
 Lawrence Pete (1966–), Detroit Lions nose tackle
 Ed Philpott (1945–), linebacker
 David Rader (1957–), quarterback, coach
 Joseph Randle (1991–), running back
 Ray Romero (1927–), guard
 Barry Sanders (1968–), Detroit Lions running back, Pro Football Hall of Fame inductee
 Gale Sayers (1943–), Chicago Bears running back, Pro Football Hall of Fame inductee
 Ryan Schraeder (1988–), offensive tackle
 Linwood Sexton (1926–), halfback
 Dreamius Smith (1992–), running back
 Jeff Smith (1962–), running back
 Laverne Smith (1954–), running back
 Sid Smith (1948–), offensive lineman
 Rashad Washington (1980–), safety
 George Whitfield, Jr. (1977–), quarterback
 Kamerion Wimbley (1983–), NFL defensive end

Baseball

 Melba Alspaugh (1925–1983), All-American Girls Professional Baseball League outfielder
 Travis Banwart (1986–), pitcher
 Jeff Berblinger (1970–), second baseman
 Fritz Brickell (1935–1965), MLB shortstop
 Greg Brummett (1967–), starting pitcher
 Clay Christiansen (1958–), pitcher
 Craig Dingman (1974–), relief pitcher
 Darren Dreifort (1972–), Los Angeles Dodgers pitcher
 Jeff Farnsworth (1975–), Detroit Tigers pitcher
 Kyle Farnsworth (1976–), MLB relief pitcher
 Gail Henley (1928–), outfielder
 John Holland (1910–1979), catcher, team manager
 Rod Kanehl (1934–2004), MLB infielder
 Don Lock (1936–2017), center fielder
 Ike McAuley (1891–1928), shortstop
 Larry McWilliams (1954–), pitcher
 Dayton Moore (1967–), manager
 Gaylen Pitts (1946–), infielder, manager, coach
 Ronn Reynolds (1958–), catcher
 Jeff Richardson (1963–), pitcher
 Nate Robertson (1977–), MLB pitcher
 Roger Slagle (1953–), pitcher
 Daryl Spencer (1928–2017), MLB utility infielder
 Danny Thompson (1947–1976), shortstop
 Bob Thurman (1917–1998), outfielder, pitcher, scout
 Logan Watkins (1989–), second baseman
 Art Weaver (1879–1917), catcher
 Duane Wilson (1934–2021), pitcher

Basketball

 Tiffany Bias (1992–), guard
 C. J. Bruton (1975–), pro basketball player
 Antoine Carr (1961–), NBA power forward, center
 Tim Carter (1956–), coach
 Greg Dreiling (1962–), NBA center, scout
 Perry Ellis (1993–), power forward
 Maurice Evans (1978–), NBA shooting guard, small forward
 Taj Gray (1984–), University of Oklahoma basketball player
 Adrian Griffin (1974–), NBA guard, small forward
 Cleo Littleton (1932–), forward
 Riney Lochmann (1944–), small forward
 Brian Martin (1962–), center, power forward
 Dave Stallworth (1941–), center, power forward
 Darnell Valentine (1959–), NBA point guard and 1980 Olympics
 Lynette Woodard (1959–), 1984 Olympic U.S. basketball player, Harlem Globetrotter, WNBA guard
 Steve Woodberry (1971–), coach
 Korleone Young (1978–), small forward

Combat sports
 Tim Elliott (1986–), mixed martial artist, UFC fighter, former Titan FC flyweight champion, winner of 24th season of The Ultimate Fighter 
 Nico Hernandez (1996–), boxer, 2016 Olympic bronze medalist (light flyweight)
 Marcio Navarro (1978–), Brazilian kickboxer and mixed martial artist that lives and trains in Wichita, former ISKA Oriental Rules Kickboxing Light Middleweight Champion

Golf
 Judy Bell (1936–), golfer
 Grier Jones (1946–), golfer, coach
 Monty Kaser (1941–2009), golfer
 Katherine Kirk (1982–), golfer
 Chez Reavie (1981–), golfer
 Tom Shaw (1938–), golfer

Racing
 Kent Howerton (1954–), motocross racer
 Rick Mears (1951–), race car driver, 4-time winner of Indy 500
 Roger Mears (1947–), off-road driver
 A.J. Shepherd (1926–2005), race car driver
 Ray Weishaar (1890–1924), motorcycle racer
 Jeff Wood (1957–), race car driver

Soccer
 Braeden Cloutier (1974–), forward, midfielder
 Caroline Kastor (1991–), forward
 Chris Lemons (1979–), midfielder
 Jamal Sutton (1982–), forward

Tennis
 Dawn Buth (1976–), tennis player, coach
 Tara Snyder (1977–), tennis player
 Katie Swan (1999–), tennis player
 Nicholas Taylor (1979–), wheelchair tennis player

Track and field
 Oliver Bradwell (1992–), sprinter
 JaCorian Duffield (1992–), high jumper
 Jim Ryun (1947–), Summer Olympic silver medalist in the 1500 meters in the 1968 Summer Olympics, U.S. Representative from Kansas

Olympians

 Caroline Bruce (1986–), Swimming, 2004 Summer
 Marc Larimer (1890–1919), Fencing, 1912 Summer
 Clarence Pinkston (1900–1961), Diving, 1920 and 1924 Summer
 Kelsey Stewart (1994–), Softball, 2020 Summer
 Marc Waldie (1955–), Volleyball, 1984 Summer

Other

 Jonathan Coachman (1973–), sports anchor
 Sam Farha (1959–), professional poker player
 Aaron Goldsmith (1983–), announcer for Seattle Mariners, Fox Sports 1
 Willis L. Hartman (1890–1978), polo player
 Conrad Holt (1993–), chess grandmaster
 Tony LeVier (1913–1998), air racer, test pilot
 Angel Medina (1970–), pro wrestler
 Scott Moninger (1966–), cyclist
 Peter Ramondetta (1982–), skateboarder

Other
 Emily Schunk (Emiru) (1998–), Twitch streamer
 Jimmy Donaldson (MrBeast) (1998–), YouTuber

Fictional
 Dennis the Menace – comic strip character

See also

 List of lists of people from Kansas
 List of Friends University people
 List of Wichita State University people

References

Further reading

 History of Wichita and Sedgwick County Kansas: Past and present, including an account of the cities, towns, and villages of the county; 2 Volumes; O.H. Bentley; C.F. Cooper & Co; 454 / 479 pages; 1910. 

Wichita, Kansas
Wichita